Prorenoic acid, or prorenoate, is a synthetic steroidal antimineralocorticoid which was never marketed.

See also
 Prorenoate potassium
 Prorenone

References

Abandoned drugs
Antimineralocorticoids
Carboxylic acids
Ketones
Pregnanes
Spirolactones
Tertiary alcohols